Guy Sprung is a film and theatre director born in Ottawa in 1947. He lives in the Mile End area of Montreal and was the artistic director of Infinitheatre for 22 years. He retired and was succeeded by Zach Fraser in March 2021.

Career
Guy Sprung co-founded Half Moon Theatre in 1972 with Maurice Colbourne and Michael Irving and was the first Artistic Director. He directed the opening production of In the Jungle of the Cities. Other productions he directed included Will Wat, If Not, What Will?, Fall In and Follow Me, Get Off My Back, Ripper!, The 3p Off Opera and Paddy. He also directed the community productions Spare Us a Copper and Driving Us Up the Wall.

Before founding the Half Moon Theatre in London, England, he was an assistant director at the Schiller Theater in Berlin. As director of the acclaimed Balconville by David Fennario, Sprung traveled with the company on an international tour to England and Ireland. In 1990, Sprung was invited to direct A Midsummer Night's Dream at the Pushkin Theatre in Moscow. The production ran in repertory for eleven years to sold-out houses. His experience in Russia inspired the work Hot Ice: Shakespeare in Moscow, A Director's Diary, "a combination of a travel journal, personal memoir, autobiography, manifesto, and director's notebook.

Sprung was the artistic director of the Toronto Free Theatre from 1982 to 1988. During this time, he conceived and founded the outdoor Shakespeare in High Park, the largest outdoor Shakespeare venue in North America.  In 2001 his Montreal theatre company, Infinithéâtre, was invited to represent Quebec and Canada at the Cairo International Festival of Experimental Theatre in Egypt, with its bilingual production of Samuel Beckett's Endgame/Fin de Partie. Sprung created the bilingual version, directed the production, and also played the part of Nagg when Marc Gélinas was in too poor health to play the role he originated. Sprung is fluent in French and German and became proficient in Russian while directing in Moscow.

He was co-founder and first sole Artistic Director of The Canadian Stage Company, an Associate Director at the Stratford Festival, and interim Artistic Director of the Vancouver Playhouse Theatre Company and has taught at the National Theatre School of Canada and the Conservatoire d'art dramatique de Montréal.

Sprung also has a serious track record as a journalist and writer. He was a theatre critic for the Montreal Star in the 1970’s and a literary columnist for the Montreal Gazette in the 1990’s. He has written for journals and newspapers across the country. His published works include Hot Ice, a diary of directing Shakespeare in Russian at the Pushkin Theatre and the plays Death And Taxes and Fight On!

Personal life
He was briefly married to actress Kate Trotter in the 1980s.

He has three children.

Sources
Company Website, http://www.infinitheatre.com/allaboutus/allaboutus.html#director
Canadian Theatre Encyclopedia, http://www.canadiantheatre.com/dict.pl?term=Sprung%2C%20Guy
Theatre Jean-Duceppe, https://archive.today/20130122073531/http://www.duceppe.com/bio/bio.asp?IDpiece=49&IDauacmet=198&IDOrdre=1
Stages of half Moon, http://www.stagesofhalfmoon.org.uk/personnel/guy-sprung/

External links 
 Guy Sprung fonds (R15968) at Library and Archives Canada
 

Canadian theatre directors
Living people
People from Le Plateau-Mont-Royal
Year of birth missing (living people)
Canadian artistic directors